The 2013–14 EHF Women's Champions League is the 21st edition of the EHF Women's Champions League, the competition for top women's clubs of Europe, organized and supervised by the European Handball Federation.

Győri Audi ETO KC were the title holder and successfully defended their title.

Overview

Format
The clubs were drawn into four groups of four and played a semifinal and the final. The winner of the qualification groups advanced to the group stage.

Team allocation

TH Title Holder

Round and draw dates

Qualification stage

Qualification tournament
A total of 17 teams took part in the qualification tournaments. The clubs were drawn into four groups of four and played a semifinal and the final. The winner of the qualification groups advanced to the group stage. Matches were played at 14–15 September 2013. The draw took place on 27 June, at 14:00 local time at Vienna, Austria.

Seedings

Playoff
The winner advanced to the qualification phase 2.

|}

Qualification tournament 1

Qualification tournament 2

Qualification tournament 3

Qualification tournament 4

Group stage

The draw of the group matches was held on 28 July in Vienna. A total of sixteen teams will be concerned in the process, to be divided into four pots of four. Teams are divided into four pots, based on EHF coefficients. Clubs from the same pot or the same association could not be drawn into the same group.

Seedings

Group A

Group B

Group C

Group D

Main round

The draw of the group matches was held on 19 November at the Gartenhotel Altmannsdorf in Vienna. A total of eight teams were concerned in the process, to be divided into two pots of four. Teams were divided into two pots, based on EHF coefficients. Clubs from the same pot or group could not be drawn into the same group.

Seedings

Group 1

Group 2

Final Four

In November 2013 the European Handball Federation announced  that for the first time in the competition's history, the winner of the EHF Women's Champions League would be decided in a Final Four tournament. The event took place at the László Papp Budapest Sports Arena in Budapest, Hungary on 3–4 May 2014.

All-Star Team
Goalkeeper: 
Left wing: 
Left back: 
Playmaker: 
Pivot: 
Right back: 
Right wing:

Other awards
Most Valuable Player: 
Best Defence Player:

References

External links
 

 
Women's EHF Champions League
EHF
EHF